Dongfeng Subdistrict is a subdistrict located on the northeastern side of Fangshan District, Beijing, China. It borders Hebei Town to its north, Qinglonghu Town and Chengguan Subdistrict to its east, and Xiangyang Subdistrict to its south and west. It had a population of 22,556 as of the 2020 census. 

The name Dongfeng came from Dongfeng Chemical Factory within the subdistrict.

History

Administrative Divisions 
In the year 2021, Dongfeng Subdistrict had 8 communities under its administration:

See also 
 List of township-level divisions of Beijing

References 

Fangshan District
Subdistricts of Beijing